The hundred of Halberton was the name of a small district, one of thirty two ancient administrative units of Devon, England.

The parishes in the hundred were:

Burlescombe (part)
Halberton
Sampford Peverell
Uplowman (part)
Willand

See also
List of hundreds of England and Wales - Devon

References

Hundreds of Devon